Vladivostok Time (VLAT) (vladivostokskoye vremya), is a time zone in Russia, named after the city of Vladivostok. It is ten hours ahead of UTC (UTC+10:00) and seven hours ahead of Moscow Time (MSK+7).

On 27 March 2011, Russia moved to year-round daylight saving time.  Instead of switching between UTC+10:00 in winter and UTC+11:00 in summer, Vladivostok Time became fixed at UTC+11:00 until 2014, when it was reset back to UTC+10:00 year-round.

IANA time zone database 
In the zone.tab of the IANA time zone database the corresponding zones is Asia/Vladivostok.

Areas on Vladivostok Time 
 Khabarovsk Krai
 Central parts of the Sakha Republic (Oymyakonsky District, Ust-Yansky District and Verkhoyansky District)
 The Jewish Autonomous Oblast
 Primorsky Krai
Between 26 October 2014 and 24 April 2016 Vladivostok Time was used in Magadan Oblast and Sakhalin.

Cities on Vladivostok Time 
Cities and towns with more than 100,000 inhabitants using Vladivostok Time:
 Artyom
 Khabarovsk
 Komsomolsk-on-Amur
 Nakhodka
 Ussuriysk
 Vladivostok

See also 
Time in Russia

References

Time zones
Time in Russia